Simon Rinalducci of Todi was a famous Italian Augustinian friar and preacher of the 13th century.

Life
Rinalducci became an Augustinian friar in 1280. By that time he was already notable for his theological studies. He was a lector, prior of several houses, rumored miracle worker, and in his time, a famous preacher. He was eventually raised to the position of Augustinian provincial prior in Umbria. An episode in his life involves a general chapter conference in 1318, during which he was unjustly accused of several serious charges. Simon chose to keep silence rather than incite scandal among his brothers, and he was eventually acquitted.

Contemporary chronicler Jordan of Saxony writes about this episode in his Life of the Brethren:

In May 1311, it is recorded that the bishop of Terni gave the Augustinians of his episcopal see a church in the diocese chiefly at the request of Rinalducci, whom he held as a very close friend.

Rinalducci died at Bologna in the monastery of Saint James the Great on 20 April 1322.

Veneration
Blessed Simon's relics are venerated at the monastery in Bologna where he died. His feast day is celebrated 20 April, especially in the Augustinian Order. Blessed Simon's cultus was confirmed by Pope Gregory XVI on 19 March 1833.

References

External links
Blessed Simon of Todi
Den salige Simon Rinalducci av Todi ( -1322) 

1322 deaths
Augustinian friars
Italian beatified people
People from Todi
14th-century venerated Christians
Year of birth unknown